David James Wottle (born August 7, 1950) is an American retired middle-distance track athlete. He was the gold medalist in the 800 meter run at the 1972 Summer Olympics in Munich and a world record holder in the 800 meters. In 1973, Wottle also ran the 3rd fastest Mile in history. He was known for wearing a golf cap while running.

Early life
Dave Wottle was born in Canton, Ohio. During his childhood he was very slim and feeble. His family doctor told him that he needed to do something, such as running, to strengthen himself. The young boy took this advice and started to run.

Running career

High school running
Wottle attended Canton Lincoln High School in Canton, Ohio, graduating in 1968. Wottle was the 1968 Ohio State champion in the mile, after finishing 4th in 1967.

Collegiate running
Competing for Bowling Green State University, Wottle finished second to Marty Liquori in the mile run at the 1970 NCAA Outdoor Track and Field Championships. That same year he represented his country in the 800 meters at the World University Games in Turin narrowly missing the final. During the 1971 season Wottle was hampered by injuries, but a year later in 1972 he won the 1,500 meter race at the NCAA Outdoor Track and Field Championships.

1972 Olympics
Leading up to the 1972 Olympic Games in Munich, Germany, Wottle won the AAU 800 meter title before equaling the world record over 800 meters of 1:44.3 at the US Olympic Trials.

In the 800 meter final at the Olympics, Wottle immediately dropped to the rear of the field, and stayed there for the first 500 m, at which point he started to pass runner after runner up the final straightaway. He seized the lead in the final stretch to beat pre-race favorite Yevgeny Arzhanov of the Soviet Union by just 0.03 seconds. This gained him the nickname of "The Head Waiter". (Another nickname was "Wottle the Throttle"). Stunned by his victory, Wottle forgot to remove his cap on the podium during the national anthem. This was interpreted by some as a form of protest, but Wottle later apologized at the news conference following the medals ceremony. He also competed in the 1500 meter run at the Munich Olympics, but he was eliminated in the semi-finals.

His signature cap was originally used for practical purposes. He sported long hair at the peak of his career, so the hat kept his hair out of his face. After realizing the cap was part of his identity and for good luck, he wore it for the remainder of his career.

Post-Olympics
At the 1973 NCAA Outdoor Track and Field Championships Wottle won the mile run in a time of 3:57.1. He earned a Bachelor of Science in History from Bowling Green State University in 1973.

In June, 1973, Wottle and 1972 U.S. Olympic teammate Steve Prefontaine (5000M) raced each other in the mile at a meet at the University of Oregon. Wottle defeated Prefontaine on his home track, running 3:53.3, which was the 3rd fastest mile in history at the time. Prefontaine ran 3:54.6, the 9th fastest mile at the time. Only world record holder Jim Ryun (3:51.1) and Kip Keino (3:53.1) had run the mile faster than Wottle. After the race, a fan attempted to run off with Wottle's signature golf cap, but he chased the thief outside the stadium and retrieved his cap.

Professional career in athletics
Wottle turned professional in 1974, but retired from competitive running quite soon after that. Later, he became a college track coach at Walsh College (Ohio) (1975–77) and Bethany College (West Virginia) where he also served as Director of Admissions (1977–81).

Career after athletics

Wottle served as an administrator at Rhodes College from August 1983 until his retirement in June 2012. He was Dean of Admissions and Financial Aid for 28 years before spending his final year at the school as the Special Assistant to the President. He then served as the Interim Vice-President for Enrollment Management at Millsaps College.  From September 2013 to April 2014, Wottle was the interim Vice President for Enrollment at Ohio Wesleyan University in Delaware, Ohio.

Awards and honors
Bowling Green State University inducted Wottle into its Hall of Fame in 1978.
Wottle was inducted into the USA Track and Field Hall of Fame in 1982.
In 1990, the Mid American Conference inducted Wottle into their Hall of Fame.
In 2016, Wottle was inducted by the Ohio High School State Athletic Association into their Circle of Champions.

References

External links

 
 
 
 
 

1950 births
Living people
American male middle-distance runners
Athletes (track and field) at the 1972 Summer Olympics
Bowling Green Falcons men's track and field athletes
Olympic gold medalists for the United States in track and field
Sportspeople from Canton, Ohio
Medalists at the 1972 Summer Olympics